Michal Beneš (born 26 November 1967) is a former Czech professional football referee. He was a full international for FIFA since 1999. He was appointed on 2001 FIFA U-17 World Championship and refereed some UEFA Champions League matches.

References 

1967 births
Living people
Czech football referees